HMS Asia was a 74-gun third-rate ship of the line of the Royal Navy, launched on 2 December 1811 at Frindsbury.

War of 1812
On 26 July 1813 Asia sailed from Negril as escort to a convoy bound for London.

Asia was off Chesapeake Bay in July 1814. The Royal Marine Artillery company of the 3rd Battalion, Royal Marines were ferried from Bermuda to the Chesapeake aboard Asia, via . Asia was among Admiral Alexander Cochrane's fleet moored off New Orleans at the start of 1815. In support of the attack on New Orleans, 107 Royal Marines from Asia were disembarked. Under the rules of prize-money, the Asia shared in the proceeds of the capture of the American vessels in the Battle of Lake Borgne on 14 December 1814.

Renamed as HMS Alfred in 1819.
From 1822 to 1828 Asia was reduced to a 50-gun fourth rate Frigate, and was eventually broken up in 1865.

Footnotes
Notes

Citations

References

 Crawford, Michael J. (Ed) (2002). The Naval War of 1812: A Documentary History, Vol. 3. Washington: United States Department of Defense. 
Lavery, Brian (2003) The Ship of the Line - Volume 1: The development of the battlefleet 1650-1850. Conway Maritime Press. .

External links
 

Ships of the line of the Royal Navy
Vengeur-class ships of the line
Ships built on the River Medway
1811 ships
War of 1812 ships of the United Kingdom